Mit Elwan is a village in the Kafr El Sheikh Governorate in Egypt.

See also

 List of cities and towns in Egypt

References 

Geography of Egypt